Houndé Airport  is a public use airport located near Houndé, Tuy, Burkina Faso.

See also
List of airports in Burkina Faso

References

External links 
 Airport record for Houndé Airport at Landings.com

Airports in Burkina Faso
Tuy Province